Ellen Rosemary Crozier is a fictional character on the New Zealand soap opera Shortland Street, who was portrayed by Robyn Malcolm for nearly six years in the mid to late 1990s.

Creation and casting
Robyn Malcolm "won" the role of Ellen Crozier during the shows third season in 1994. At the time, the shows primary writers were James Griffin and Rachel Lang and Malcolm remembers the period as not only a highlight of her career, but of Shortland Street in general. Malcolm retained the role for nearly 6 years. Malcolm made her last appearance in November 1999.

Storylines
Ellen arrived to replace Jaki (Nancy Brunning) with daughter Minnie and husband Johnny (Stelios Yiakmis). However soon after they arrived, the marriage broke up when Johnny strayed. Depressed and alone, Ellen accidentally burnt down the house with a lit cigarette. The arrival of Ellen's sister Carla didn't help when Ellen discovered her sister was a possible psychopath. Ellen dated Bernie Leach (Timothy Bartlett) but ended up returning to Johnny for a short lived affair. Ellen revealed to Minnie that she was a product of rape and she was devastated when Carla tried to murder her after being sectioned. Ellen started to date David Kearney (Peter Elliott) but Ellen misinterpreted the arrival of his wife and fled. The two reunited in Fiji where Ellen confessed she was pregnant.

The two married but the death of their baby Rose (Georgia Bishop) the following year, separated the two and they both had affairs. They finally decided to reunite but David felt obliged to stay with his girlfriend who was dying from cancer. The reconciled when David was diagnosed with a blinding disorder and the two left for an early retirement. Ellen informed Waverley Wilson (Claire Chitham) on the phone, that she and David would not be attending her marriage to David's son Fergus (Paul Ellis).

Character development

Cot death storyline
In 1996, producers decided to have Shortland Street undergo a cot death storyline and the decision was made for the character of Ellen to undergo it. Needing a suitable father character, writers paired Ellen with relatively new character, David Kearney (Peter Elliott). Ellen and David had been dating for several months but the arrival of his ex-wife Isobel Kearney (Jennifer Ward-Lealand) lead to Ellen thinking the two had reconciled, causing her to flee to Fiji. In a specially shot episode in the country, David tracked her down and the two reconciled, only for Ellen to announce she was pregnant. The couple decided to marry to support the child and lured their friends to the ceremony under the pretense that it was Grace Kwan's (Lyentte Forday) birthday. Producers encountered a problem when developing the storyline, when they realized they had accidentally over run Ellen's pregnancy. A quick fill in story was devised where Ellen was nervous that the baby was so late. In the casting of Ellen and David's child, the daughter of the show's medical adviser was chosen. Having set the storyline up to unfold in 1998, crew members began to get cold feet due to the uneasiness of shooting the scene using one of their co workers own children and the fact that two of the storyliners had fallen pregnant. On screen, Ellen had an unscheduled birth, giving birth to Rose Crozier-Kearney (Georgia Bishop) in her bathroom, but help arrived in the form of Caroline Buxton (Tandi Wright) just in time. Due to the tenderness of the storyline, it was continuously pushed back until the stage where it was nearing the point of improbability. The plot was ultimately scheduled to air in the last possible week with the potential of cot death to occur. In February 1998, Ellen was shocked to discover her baby daughter Rose, had died in her sleep. The scene was shot with the baby's actress but Malcolm was directed to quickly pick her up and then the shot was changed to a close up, to avoid any movements from the child. The couple's devastation at Rose's death saw them break up and date other characters. However, over a year later they finally put Rose to rest and reconciled. The storyline landed Malcolm with her first ever television acting nomination. The subject of a child's death was dealt with twice more in the soap, 5 years later in the death of Te Ngakau Hudson, and 10 years later with the death of Kelly Piper.

Reception
The character of Ellen received a hugely favorable reception and is often looked back on by reviewers with a positive view. Ellen's pairing with David Kearney (Peter Elliott) proved to be hugely popular and by the mid nineties, the family unit based around the character was the most integral and high-profile set of characters in the soap. The role of Ellen was said to have made Malcolm a household name in New Zealand and though entirely different than her role of Cheryl West in Outrageous Fortune, was believed to be a paving stone. The show's main writers throughout the mid nineties, James Griffin and Rachel Lang (future creators of Outrageous Fortune), gave Ellen the nickname "slut in a cardigan". The cot death of Ellen's daughter Rose turned out to be a widely well received storyline and is remembered as one of the most iconic to feature on the soap. From the cot death storyline, Malcolm went on to be nominated for "Best Actress" in the 1998 TV Guide Best on the Box Awards. In 2000, a reviewer for The New Zealand Herald criticized the show and called for the return of Ellen, a character she actually cared about. The departure of Ellen amongst several other core characters, saw a fall in the ratings for the soap and several measures were made to fix this, such as the reintroduction of Chris Warner (Michael Galvin). In 2017 New Zealand Herald columnist Ricardo Simich expressed his desire for Ellen to return for the soap opera's 25th anniversary saying it would be remiss not celebrate Malcolm's success. That same year stuff.co.nz journalist Fleur Mealing named Ellen as the 3rd character she most wanted to return for the show's 25th anniversary, citing the need to celebrate where Malcolm started her career.

References

Shortland Street characters
Fictional nurses
Television characters introduced in 1994
Female characters in television